The Alliance for Patriotic Reorientation and Construction (APRC) is a political party in The Gambia. Founded by army officers who staged a coup in 1994, it was the dominant ruling party from 1996 until 2016 with president Yahya Jammeh.

History
It was formed in 1996 to support army leader Yahya Jammeh's campaign for the 1996 elections. It generally garners high support among voters from Jammeh's Jola ethnic group. Most appointed APRC government officials were from this group as well.

Jammeh won the 2001 presidential elections with 52.8% of the popular vote. In National Assembly elections in 2002, the party won 45 of 48 seats, 33 of them unopposed. The elections were boycotted by the oppositional United Democratic Party.

APRC candidate and incumbent Yahya Jammeh won a third five-year term in presidential elections held on 22 September 2006, receiving 67.3% of the vote.

The APRC won 42 of 48 seats in the 25 January 2007 National Assembly election and 43 of 48 seats in the 29 March 2012 National Assembly election.

In the 2016 presidential elections, for the first time since officially taking power in the 1996 presidential elections, APRC incumbent Jammeh lost the presidency to coalition challenger Adama Barrow, garnering only 39.6% of the vote to Barrow's 43.3%. In the 2017 parliamentary elections, the APRC lost much of its support, while its long-time rival United Democratic Party gained a landslide victory.

In 2021, the APRC did not run their own candidate but instead formed an alliance with Barrow, their former opponent. Jammeh disavowed the alliance and endorsed Mama Kandeh of the Gambia Democratic Congress instead, forcing a split in the party.

Electoral history

Presidential elections

National Assembly elections

References 

Political parties established in 1996
Political parties in the Gambia
Main